Framranten Point is a rocky point that extends northwestward from Kuvungen Hill, near the southwest end of the Kirwan Escarpment in Queen Maud Land, Antarctica. It was mapped by Norwegian cartographers from surveys and air photos by the Norwegian–British–Swedish Antarctic Expedition (1949–52) and from additional air photos (1958–59), and named Framranten.

References

Headlands of Queen Maud Land
Princess Martha Coast